Xonix is a video game written for MS-DOS compatible operating systems by Ilan Raab and Dani Katz. It is similar in concept to Taito's 1982 arcade video game Qix. The objective is to fence off sections of a playfield while avoiding bouncing balls.

Legacy
Xonix was popular at the Dorodnicyn Computing Centre, where Dmitry Pavlovsky, one of the original developers of Tetris, was a computer engineer. Pavlovsky and Vadim Gerasimov wrote their own version of Xonix called Antix. It was first developed for the Electronika 60 and then ported to MS-DOS by Pavlovsky and Vadim Gerasimov.

References

External links

A C64 port of XONIX, called Zolyx, released by Firebird in 1987.

DOS games
Action video games
1984 video games
Video game clones
Video games developed in the United States

Qix clones